Lynn & Wade LLP is a musical/production duo consisting of the producer Peter Wade Keusch and the singer-songwriter Michelle Bell. 

As their production and writing careers advanced, they gave up work on their unfinished album The Mystery LLP and it is yet to be released.

Five songs written and produced by Lynn & Wade are used on the Jennifer Lopez album Brave ("Never Gonna Give Up", "The Way It Is", "Be Mine", "I Need Love" and "Frozen Moments").

References

External links
Lynn and Wade LLP at Myspace

Record production duos
American musical duos